Barbaroux is a French surname. Notable people with the surname include:

 Catherine Barbaroux (born 1949), French politician
 Charles Jean Marie Barbaroux (1767-1794), French politician
 Françoise Barbaroux (1761-1822), mistress of Antoine Philippe, Duke of Montpensier

See also 

 :fr:Barbaroux

Surnames of French origin
French-language surnames